Armand Thirard (1899–1973) was a French cinematographer. He worked on more than a hundred and twenty films during his career.

Selected filmography
 The Man with the Hispano (1926)
 The Marriage of Mademoiselle Beulemans (1927)
 Nile Water (1928)
 The Divine Voyage (1929)
 Moon Over Morocco (1931)
 The Five Accursed Gentlemen (1932)
 A Man's Neck (1933)
 To the Polls, Citizens (1932)
 The Man with the Hispano (1933)
 The Weaker Sex (1933)
 Les yeux noirs (1935)
 Parisian Life (1936)
 Mayerling (1936)
 The Volga Boatman (1936)
 The Brighton Twins (1936)
 The Citadel of Silence (1937)
 Tricoche and Cacolet (1938)
 The Patriot (1938)
 The Murderer Lives at Number 21 (1942)
 Shop Girls of Paris (1943)
 Adrien (1943)
Farandole (1945)
 Roger la Honte (1946)
 Pastoral Symphony (1946)
 Rendezvous in Paris (1947)
 After Love (1948)
 Miquette (1950)
 Paris Still Sings (1951)
 If All the Guys in the World (1955)
 Spring, Autumn and Love (1955)
 Mademoiselle from Paris (1955)
 Les Diaboliques (1955)
 And God Created Woman (1956)
 Three Days to Live (1957)
 The Night Heaven Fell (1958)
 The Daughter of Hamburg (1958)
 The Truth (1960)
 The Three Musketeers (1961)
 Guns for San Sebastian (1968)

References

Bibliography
  Raimondo-Souto, H. Mario. Motion Picture Photography: A History, 1891-1960. McFarland, 2006.

External links

1899 births
1973 deaths
French cinematographers